Henry Cotto (born January 5, 1961) is a former professional baseball outfielder. He played all or parts of ten seasons in Major League Baseball, from 1984 until 1993. He also played one season in Japan for the Yomiuri Giants in 1994, winning the 1994 Japan Series. After a brief return to the minor leagues in 1995, he retired.

Cotto played in the Puerto Rican winter baseball league for the Criollos de Caguas during the 1980s.

In 884 games over 10 seasons, Cotto posted a .261 batting average (569-for-2178) with 296 runs, 44 home runs, 210 RBI and 130 stolen bases. He finished his career with a .989 fielding percentage playing at all three outfield positions.

From 1996, Cotto served as a coach in the farm system of the Seattle Mariners. Cotto served as a hitting instructor for the Everett AquaSox from 2007 to 2010. He has most recently been a roving instructor for the San Francisco Giants farm system and is currently the manager of the Arizona League Giants.

References

External links

1961 births
American expatriate baseball players in Japan
Chicago Cubs players
Columbus Clippers players
Florida Marlins players
Iowa Cubs players
Living people
Major League Baseball outfielders
Major League Baseball replacement players
Midland Cubs players
Nashville Sounds players
New York Yankees players
Baseball players from New York City
Quad Cities Cubs players
Seattle Mariners players
Yomiuri Giants players
People from Caguas, Puerto Rico
Minor league baseball managers